Pearl is an American sitcom television series which aired on CBS from September 16, 1996 until June 25, 1997. The series starred Rhea Perlman, in what was her return to television after the conclusion of her long-running series Cheers three years earlier on NBC. Don Reo created the series, and Perlman served as an executive producer alongside Reo, Paul Junger Witt, Tony Thomas and Gary S. Levine. Pearl was produced by Impact Zone Productions and Witt/Thomas Productions in association with Warner Bros. Television.

Plot
Pearl Caraldo (Rhea Perlman), a middle-aged widow, is the loading dock manager for University Electronics but who wants to achieve a higher level of education. She is accepted as a night student at the prestigious Swindon University. By contrast, her 20-year-old son Joey (Dash Mihok), a single father with no apparent ambition, is disappointed that his mother is no longer readily available as a live-in babysitter for his infant daughter. Also less than thrilled is Pearl's sister-in-law Annie (Carol Kane), who is concerned that with her greater educational attainment, Pearl will become another "one of them intellectuals."  A professor of a required course, Stephen Pynchon (Malcolm McDowell), further complicates matters by his belief that higher education is for a cultured elite, not working-class people like Pearl, and sets out to embarrass and belittle her whenever possible in hopes that she will withdraw from the university.

Cast

Main cast
 Rhea Perlman as Pearl Caraldo
 Carol Kane as Annie Caraldo
 Kevin Corrigan as Franklin 'Frankie' Spivak
 Dash Mihok as Joey Caraldo
 Lucy Liu as Amy Li
 Malcolm McDowell as Prof. Stephen Pynchon

Guest cast
 Candice Azzara as Beverly Steinberg
 Billy Connolly as William 'Billy' Pynchon
 Alice Cooper as Himself
 Nikki Cox as Margaret Woodrow
 Bryan Cranston as Isaac Perlow
 Ted Danson as Sal
 Jonathan Del Arco as Carlo Morra
 Danny DeVito as Dean Aston Martin
 Seth Green as Bob
 Steve Landesberg as Saul Steinberg
 Aubrey Morris as Professor Lockwood
 Kenny Rogers as Himself
 Mara Wilson as Samantha Stein

Production
When Malcolm McDowell's name was put forward as a candidate to play Prof. Pynchon, creator Don Reo was initially skeptical, feeling that McDowell was more associated with villainous parts, but when McDowell read for the part, it was clear that he was very suitable. McDowell modeled the character on Lindsay Anderson, as well as British comics Eric Morecambe, Benny Hill, and John Cleese.<ref>[http://ew.com/article/1996/12/06/pearls-malcolm-mcdowell/ Entertainment Weekly: 'Pearls Malcolm McDowell]</ref>

Episodes

 Release 
"Pearl" was broadcast on Wednesday evenings at 8:30 p.m. on CBS, opposite The John Larroquette Show on NBC, a show that was also created by Don Reo. Reo said "It's a really difficult, bizarre phenomenon, ... the Larroquette show is in its fourth year and the last thing in the world I want to do is contribute to its demise."

Reception
Critical receptionPearl received very positive reviews, David Bianculli reviewed it in the New York Daily News comparing it to the 1973 movie The Paper Chase, and calling it "a gem." He also said James Burrows "directs the pilot masterfully." For the Buffalo News, Alan Pergament said that "McDowell really is the star of the show, delivering his sarcastic lines with relish," and that "with some minor polishing" the show "could really give Perlman something more to cheer about." Tom Jicha in the Sun-Sentinel also called it "a gem" and says that Perlman and McDowell's "exchanges crackle with venomous vitality." He also calls McDowell "a revelation in his episodic TV debut" stating that "he has the comedic timing of someone who has been doing it all his life."

Awards

References

Further reading
 Brooks, Tim and Marsh, Earle, The Complete Directory to Prime Time Network and Cable TV Shows''

External links
 Official Website
 
 

1996 American television series debuts
1997 American television series endings
1990s American college television series
1990s American sitcoms
CBS original programming
English-language television shows
Television series by Warner Bros. Television Studios
Television shows set in New Jersey